The Order of Mono is the highest Togolese order of chivalry, established on September 2, 1961 by President Sylvanus Olympio. The order is named after the major river passing through the country: the Mono River. The Order of Mono consists of five grades, awarded to both Togolese civilians and military personnel, as well as to foreign nationals.

Grades
The five grades of the Order of Mono are Grand Cross, Grand Officer, Commander, Officer and Knight, and only a limited number of Togolese citizens can be appointed to, and hold, each grade at any one time. The grade of Knight is limited to 1000 Togolese, 500 for Officer, 100 for Commander, 50 for Grand Officer and 10 for Grand Cross. Honorary awards, given to foreign nationals, do not count towards these limits.

Notable recipients
Lamine Diack
Levi Eshkol
Kim Il-sung
Ellen Johnson-Sirleaf
Salim Ahmed Salim
Haile Selassie
Zalman Shazar
Joseph Broz Tito

See also
Togo
Togolese Armed Forces
List of heads of state of Togo
List of heads of government of Togo

References

Orders, decorations, and medals of Togo
Awards established in 1961
1961 establishments in Togo